Attempt to Kill is a 1961 British film. It was a rare feature directed by Royston Morley, and based on a story by Edgar Wallace, The Lone House Mystery. It was one of a series of Edgar Wallace Mysteries, British second-features, produced at Merton Park Studios in the 1960s.

Premise
A businessman fires one of his employees, then someone tries to murder him. The fired man becomes the prime suspect.

Cast
Derek Farr as Det. Insp. Minter
Tony Wright as Gerry Hamilton
Richard Pearson as Frank Weyman
Freda Jackson as Mrs. Weyman
Patricia Mort as Elisabeth Gray
J.G. Devlin as Elliott 
Clifford Earl as Sgt. Bennett
Denis Holmes as Fraser
Allan Jeager as Gardener
Grace Arnold as Housekeeper
Trevor Reid as Bank Manager
Frances Bennett as Barmaid

References

External links
Attempt to Kill at BFI
Attempt to Kill at Letterbox DVD
Attempt to Kill at IMDb

1961 films
British drama films
1961 drama films
1960s English-language films
Edgar Wallace Mysteries
British black-and-white films
1960s British films